is a traditional Japanese  undergarment for adult males and females, made from a length of cotton.

However, it fell out of use quickly after the war with the introduction of new underwear to the Japanese market, such as briefs, boxer briefs and panties.

Types and uses

They are also depicted on clay figures, . The  was the underwear of choice of every Japanese adult male and female, rich or poor, high or low status, until after the Second World War, when Americanization popularized elasticized undergarments.

The  comes in several basic styles. The most relaxed type consists of a strip of cloth, wound around the hips, secured at the small of the back by knotting or twisting, with the excess brought forward between the legs, and tucked through the cloth belt in front to hang as an apron.

The second style, for people who are active, is formed when the cloth is wound around the hips so that there is an excess of an apron, which is brought back again between the legs and twisted around the belt-cloth in the back. The  is often twisted to create a thong effect at the back. It was also the standard male bathing suit. Male children learning to swim during the early 1960s were often told to wear this kind of  because a boy in trouble could be easily lifted out of the water by the back cloth of his .

The third style, called , which originated in the vicinity of Toyama Prefecture, is a long rectangle of cloth with tapes at one narrow end.  is a length of cloth, however it has a strip of material at the waist to form a fastening or string. The dimensions are  width by about  length, and it is tied with the material strip in front of the body. One ties the tapes around the hips, with the cloth at the small of the back, and then pulls the cloth between the legs and through the belt, letting the remainder hang as an apron. Such  was issued to Japanese troops in World War II, and often were the sole garb of Allied POWs in tropic areas.
The best material for this is white linen or white cotton. Silk crepe may be used according to one's taste, but plain silk is not suitable. In winter it may be lined with similar material, but in other seasons it is always single. Both ends (or front and back) are hemmed to put cords through. One of the cords forms a loop to suspend the front end from the neck, and the other secures the back end by being tied in the front.

Variations

During February, nearly 10,000 men will gather at Saidaiji Temple in Okayama wearing only  to participate in the festival in hopes of gaining luck for the entire year.

The samurai wore  as underwear with armor, combined with a  shirt. Outside Japan it is perhaps best known from the drumming groups Ondekoza and Kodo, who appear dressed in only a white  and a headband.  is sometimes used as traditional swimsuits. In some high schools, boys swim wearing . In the pools and beaches of Japan, -wearing swimmers occasionally can be seen.

In late 2008, the Japanese firm Wacoal began marketing  for women and have had greater than expected sales. The loincloths for women come in seven different colors and two designs—plain and chequered.

Cultural comparisons
The Japanese idiom  ('tighten your loincloth') means the same as the English phrase "roll up your sleeves" or even more accurately "gird up your loins"—in other words, get ready for some hard work. The Japanese idiom  (literally, 'anyone else's ') means borrow or use tools or materials of anyone else.

See also

Loincloth
Kaupina

List of Japanese clothing

Kodō
, loincloth worn in sumo wrestling

References

External links

 "The Loincloth of Borneo" by Otto Steinmayer – A scholarly article on the wearing of loincloths, with brief mentions of fundoshi. Includes social and cultural connotations, modesty issues, etc.
 Fundoshi – Japanese Loincloth – the three basic types of fundoshi (via the Wayback Machine)
 Fundoshi (loincloth) – brief history and types
 Tying fundoshi:
 How to tie a Fundoshi – via the Wayback Machine
 Knotting the Rokusyaku Fundoshi – diagram
 How to put on a Fundoshi 褌 Japanese loin cloth video – via the Wayback Machine

Japanese lower-body garments
Samurai clothing
Shinto religious clothing
Undergarments
Japanese words and phrases